Zitong County is a county in the northeast of Sichuan Province, China. It is under the administration of the prefecture-level city of Mianyang.

It was made a county .

Famous people include: Sima Xiangru, Pu Fuzhou, Hai Deng, Li Youxing.

Historical sites
Zitong has three historical sites listed in the official list of Chinese national historic sites.: 
 Qiqushan temple (Qiqushan damiao)
 Liye tower (Liye que)
 Wolongshan temple (Wolong shan Qianfo yan shiku)

Aftermath of the 2008 Earthquake
Zitong, like neighbouring counties, was located near the epicentre of the 2008 Sichuan earthquake. Infrastructures in Zitong was partly destroyed, and drinking water was not available.

Also the Qiqushan Temple, who is since 1996 on the official list of Chinese national historical sites was partly destroyed by the earthquake.

Climate

References

External links

Official website of Zitong County government

 
County-level divisions of Sichuan
Mianyang